The Birmingham Stallions are a professional American football team based in Birmingham, Alabama. The Stallions compete in the United States Football League (USFL) as a member club of the league's South division, and are the league's current champions, defeating the Philadelphia Stars 33–30 at Tom Benson Hall of Fame Stadium in Canton, Ohio, on July 3, 2022.

History 
The Birmingham Stallions were one of eight teams that were officially announced as a USFL franchise on The Herd with Colin Cowherd on November 22, 2021 On January 6, 2022, it was revealed that former NCAA coach Gene Chizik would become the head coach of the Stallions. Chizik confirmed the report, but the parties never reached an agreement and he ultimately took a deal to become the defensive coordinator of the North Carolina Tar Heels two days later. On January 20, 2022, it was announced on The Herd with Colin Cowherd that former NCAA football head coach Skip Holtz was named the head coach and General manager of the Stallions.

The Stallions finished the 2022 regular season with a 9–1 record, winning the South division title, and clinched the South division's first seed. The Stallions hosted their first South Division Championship game facing the second-seed New Orleans Breakers. The Stallions then defeated the Breakers 31–17 and advanced to the 2022 USFL Championship Game.

On July 3, 2022, in Tom Benson Hall of Fame Stadium in Canton, Ohio, the Stallions played against the North division's second seed, the Philadelphia Stars. Following halftime when the Stallions led by eleven points, a 4-yard touchdown, narrowed the Stallions' lead to five points with 5:17 remaining in the third quarter. After the Stallions were forced to attempt a 38-yard field goal, which was missed by Aubrey. Then Philadelphia's Case Cookus found Devin Gray in the end zone for a touchdown two plays later. The Stars attempted a two-point conversion, which was scored by Suell on a reception. This gave Philadelphia a 23–20 lead, their first of the game. With a 26–23 lead with under three minutes remaining, Scooby Wright had a 46-yard interception returned for a touchdown to effectively seal the game for the Stallions. Victor Bolden Jr. won the USFL Championship Game Most Valuable Player Award.

Following the 2022 season, the Stallions hired and general manager Zach Potter, a former Director of player personnel.

Championships
The Stallions have won one USFL Championships and one South Division Championships.

USFL Championships

South Division Championship Games

Players 
Initially, each team carried a 38-man active roster and a 7-man practice squad, but the rosters were increased to 40 active players and 50 total in May, 2022.

Birmingham Stallions Best Hair Award 
On June 13, 2022 the Stallions started a Best Hair Award tradition following by a teammate vote. The first ever winner was J'Mar Smith.

Personnel

Staff

Statistics and records

Season-by-season record

Note: The Finish, Wins, Losses, and Ties columns list regular season results and exclude any postseason play.

Records

References 

2021 establishments in Alabama
American football teams established in 2021
Birmingham Stallions (2022)
American football teams in Birmingham, Alabama
United States Football League (2022) teams